John McEnroe and Patrick McEnroe were the defending champions, but Patrick McEnroe did not participate.
John McEnroe played alongside Adriano Panatta, but lost in the group stage.
Andrés Gómez and Mark Woodforde won the title, defeating Mansour Bahrami and Pat Cash in the final, 6–1, 7–6(7–2).

Draw

Final

Group C
Standings are determined by: 1. number of wins; 2. number of matches; 3. in three-players-ties, percentage of sets won, or of games won; 4. steering-committee decision.

Group D
Standings are determined by: 1. number of wins; 2. number of matches; 3. in three-players-ties, percentage of sets won, or of games won; 4. steering-committee decision.

References
Main Draw

Legends Over 45 Doubles